The BET Award for Best Actress is awarded to actresses from both television and film. Some nominees have been nominated based on their performances in multiple bodies of work within the eligibility period. Taraji P. Henson holds the record for most wins and nominations in this category with six and eleven respectively.

Winners and nominees
Winners are listed first and highlighted in bold.

2000s

2010s

2020s

Multiple wins and nominations

Wins

 6 wins
 Taraji P. Henson

 3 wins
 Halle Berry

Nominations

 11 nominations
 Angela Bassett
 Taraji P. Henson

 8 nominations
 Regina King
 Gabrielle Union

 7 nominations
 Halle Berry

 6 nominations
 Viola Davis
 Issa Rae
 Kerry Washington

 5 nominations
 Queen Latifah

 3 nominations
 Jennifer Hudson
 Sanaa Lathan
 Tracee Ellis Ross
 Zoe Saldana
 Zendaya

 2 nominations
 Aaliyah
 Tichina Arnold
 Beyoncé
 Vivica A. Fox
 Tiffany Haddish
 Lupita Nyong'o
 Chandra Wilson

See also
 BET Award for Best Actor

References

Awards established in 2001
BET Awards